Marie-Antoinette Mobutu (born Marie-Antoinette Gbiatibwa Gogbe Yetene; c. 1941 in Banzyville), also known as Mama Mobutu was the first wife of Mobutu Sese Seko and First Lady of Zaire.

Biography 
Marie-Antoinette was born in Banzyville (modern-day Mobayi-Mbongo) in Équateur Province in 1941 while the Congo was still under Belgian colonial rule. She was an ethnic Ngbandi. She met and married Joseph-Désiré Mobutu, a member of the same ethnic group and then a non-commissioned officer in the Force Publique, in 1955 at the age of 14. That same year, she gave birth to their first son, Jean-Paul "Nyiwa". She attended Catholic mission schools and had supported the Roman Catholic Church despite her husband's later struggle with the Catholic clergy.

Children 
Marie Antoinette bore the most out of all of Mobutu's wives, a total of nine children:

 Jean-Paul "Nyiwa";
 Ngombo;
 Manda;
 Konga;
 Ngawali;
 Yango;
 Yakpwa;
 Kongulu;
 and Ndagbia. 

She is buried in Rabat, Morocco.

Death 
Marie-Antoinette died of heart failure on 22 October  in Genolier, Switzerland, at the age of 36. A vast mausoleum was raised in her honor. She is buried in Gbadolite,just outside the chapel in which she was originally buried by her husband, relatives had to relocate her remains from the chapel because it was destroyed.

References 

1940s births
1977 deaths
Year of birth uncertain
Deaths in Switzerland
First ladies of the Democratic Republic of the Congo
Mobutu Sese Seko
People from Nord-Ubangi